The United States Virgin Islands competed at the 15th Pan American Games held in Rio de Janeiro, Brazil from 13 July to 29 July 2007.

Results by event

Basketball

Men's team competition
 Team roster
Steven Hodge
Kevin Sheppard
Carl Krauser
Cuthbert Victor
Jameel Heywood
Jason Edwin
Darnell Miller
Kaylen Gregory
Akeem Francis
Carl Thomas
Kitwana Rhymer
Frank Elegar
 Head coach: Tevester Anderson

See also
 Virgin Islands at the 2008 Summer Olympics

External links
 Rio 2007 Official website

Nations at the 2007 Pan American Games
P
2007